Hutchinson Homestead is a historic home located at Cayuga in Cayuga County, New York.  It was built about 1910 and is a two-story, five-bay, center-hall frame dwelling in the Colonial Revival style.  It is surmounted by a low-pitched gambrel roof pierced by four brick chimneys.

It was listed on the National Register of Historic Places in 2009.

References

External links

Colonial Revival architecture in New York (state)
Houses completed in 1910
Houses on the National Register of Historic Places in New York (state)
Houses in Cayuga County, New York
National Register of Historic Places in Cayuga County, New York
Cayuga, New York